Darreh Buri (also Romanized as Darreh Būrī) is a village in Sadat Rural District, in the Central District of Lali County, Khuzestan Province, Iran. At the 2006 census, its population was 1,040, in 196 families.

References 

Populated places in Lali County